The First Philippine Legislature was the first session of the Philippine Legislature, the first representative legislature of the Philippines. Then known as the Philippine Islands, the Philippines under the sovereign control of the United States through the Insular Government. The Philippine Legislature consisted of an appointed upper house, the Philippine Commission, and an elected lower house, the Philippine Assembly. These bodies were the predecessors of the Philippine Senate and Philippine House of the Philippine Congress.

Sessions 
 Inaugural Regular Session: October 16, 1907 – February 1, 1908
 First Regular Session: February 3, 1908 – May 21, 1908
 First Special Session: May 22 – June 19, 1908
 Second Regular Session: February 1 – May 20, 1909

Legislation 
The First Philippine Legislature passed a total of 170 laws (Act Nos. 1801–1970)

Major legislation 
 Act No. 1801 — Gabaldon Act

Leadership

Philippine Commission 
 Governor-General and ex-officio President of the Philippine Commission: James Francis Smith

Philippine Assembly 
 Speaker: Sergio Osmeña (Cebu–2nd, Nacionalista)
 Majority Floor Leader: Manuel L. Quezon (Tayabas–1st, Nacionalista)
 Minority Floor Leader: Vicente Singson Encarnacion (Ilocos Sur–1st, Progresista)

Members

Philippine Commission 

Sources:

 Journal of the Philippine Commission Being the Inaugural Session of the First Philippine Legislature. Manila: Bureau of Printing. 1908.
 Journal of the Philippine Commission Being the First Session and a Special Session of the First Philippine Legislature. Manila: Bureau of Printing. 1908.
 Journal of the Philippine Commission Being the Second Session of the First Philippine Legislature. Manila: Bureau of Printing. 1910.

Philippine Assembly 

Source: 

Notes:

See also 
 Congress of the Philippines
 Senate of the Philippines
 House of Representatives of the Philippines

References

Further reading

External links 
 
 

01